The 2021 Ohio State Buckeyes baseball team was a baseball team that represented Ohio State University in the 2021 NCAA Division I baseball season. The Buckeyes were members of the Big Ten Conference and played their home games at Bill Davis Stadium in Columbus, Ohio. They were led by eleventh-year head coach Greg Beals.

Previous season
The Buckeyes finished the 2020 NCAA Division I baseball season 6–8 overall (0–0 conference) and twelfth place in conference standings, as the season was cut short in stages by March 12 due to the COVID-19 pandemic.

Preseason
For the 2021 Big Ten Conference poll, Ohio State was voted to finish in third by the Big Ten Coaches.

Roster

Schedule

! style="" | Regular Season
|- valign="top" 

|- bgcolor="#ccffcc"
| 1 || March 5 || vs  || Fluor Field at the West End • Greenville, South Carolina || 6–3 || Root (1–0) || Glassey (0–1) || None || 306 || 1–0 || 1–0
|- bgcolor="#ccffcc"
| 2 || March 6 || vs Illinois || Fluor Field at the West End • Greenville, South Carolina || 6–5 || Kean (1–0) || Maldonado (0–1) || Root (1) || – || 2–0 || 2–0
|- bgcolor="#ccffcc"
| 3 || March 6 || vs Illinois || Fluor Field at the West End • Greenville, South Carolina || 12–3 || Neely (1–0) || Rybarczyk (0–1) || Coupet (1) || 417 || 3–0 || 3–0
|- bgcolor="#ffcccc"
| 4 || March 7 || vs Illinois || Fluor Field at the West End • Greenville, South Carolina || 0–8 || Kirschsieper (1–0) || Pfennig (0–1) || None || 215 || 3–1 || 3–1
|- bgcolor="#ffcccc"
| 5 || March 12 || vs Nebraska || U.S. Bank Stadium • Minneapolis, Minnesota || 0–4 || Wallace (1–0) || Lonsway (0–1) || Nedved (1) || 250 || 3–2 || 3–2
|- bgcolor="#ffcccc"
| 6 || March 12 || vs Iowa|| U.S. Bank Stadium • Minneapolis, Minnesota || 4–10 || Povich (1–0) || Burhenn (0–1) || None || 250 || 3–3 || 3–3
|- bgcolor="#ccffcc"
| 7 || March 13 || vs Iowa || U.S. Bank Stadium • Minneapolis, Minnesota || 7–4 || Murphy (1–0) || Baumann (0–2) || Brock (1) || 50 || 4–3 || 4–3
|- bgcolor="#ccffcc"
| 8 || March 14 || vs Nebraska || U.S. Bank Stadium • Minneapolis, Minnesota || 6–4 || Root (2–0) || Bragg (0–1) || Brock (2) || 250 || 5–3 || 5–3
|- bgcolor="#ffcccc"
| 9 || March 20 || at  || Bainton Field • Piscataway, New Jersey || 5–6 || Muller (1–0) || Root (2–1) || None || – || 5–4 || 5–4
|- bgcolor="#ffcccc"
| 10 || March 21 || at Rutgers || Bainton Field • Piscataway, New Jersey || 0–2 || Wereski (3–0) || Lonsway (0–2) || Stanavich (1) || – || 5–5 || 5–5
|- bgcolor="#ccffcc"
| 11 || March 22 || at Rutgers || Bainton Field • Piscataway, New Jersey || 4–1 || Murphy (2–0) || Teller (0–2) || Brock (3) || – || 6–5 || 6–5
|- bgcolor="#ccffcc"
| 12 || March 26 || Iowa || Bill Davis Stadium • Columbus, Ohio || 8–2 || Burhenn (1–1) || Wallace (2–1) || None || 205 || 7–5 || 7–5
|- bgcolor="#ffcccc"
| 13 || March 27 || Iowa || Bill Davis Stadium • Columbus, Ohio || 1–5 || Baumann (1–2) || Lonsway (0–3) || Nedved (3) || – || 7–6 || 7–6
|- bgcolor="#ccffcc"
| 14 || March 28 || Maryland || Bill Davis Stadium • Columbus, Ohio || 5–4 || Root (3–1) || Fisher (0–3) || Brock (4) || 180 || 8–6 || 8–6
|- bgcolor="#ffcccc"
| 15 || March 29 || Maryland || Bill Davis Stadium • Columbus, Ohio || 3–9 || Savacool (4–0) || Pfenning (2–2) || Ramsey (1) || 107 || 8–7 || 8–7
|-

|- bgcolor="#ccffcc"
| 16 || April 2 || Indiana || Bill Davis Stadium • Columbus, Ohio || 3–2 || Burhenn (2–1) || Sommer (3–1) || Brock (5) || 171 || 9–7 || 9–7
|- bgcolor="#ccffcc"
| 17 || April 3 || Indiana || Bill Davis Stadium • Columbus, Ohio || 6–0 || Lonsway (1–3) || Brown (3–2) || None || 286 || 10–7 || 10–7
|- bgcolor="#ccffcc"
| 18 || April 3 || Indiana || Bill Davis Stadium • Columbus, Ohio || 5–2 || Smith (1–0) || Bothwell (1–1) || Brock (6) || 286 || 11–7 || 11–7
|- bgcolor="#ccffcc"
| 19 || April 4 || Indiana || Bill Davis Stadium • Columbus, Ohio || 4–3 || Murphy (3–0) || Modugno (1–1) || None || 215 || 12–7 || 12–7
|- bgcolor="#ccffcc"
| 20 || April 9 || at No. 25 Michigan || Ray Fisher Stadium • Ann Arbor, Michigan || 7–4 || Gahm (1–0) || Pace (2–1) || Brock (7) || 250 || 13–7 || 13–7
|- bgcolor="#ffcccc"
| 21 || April 10 || at No. 25 Michigan || Ray Fisher Stadium • Ann Arbor, Michigan || 0–7 || Weston (4–1) || Lonsway (1–4) || None || 250 || 13–8 || 13–8
|- bgcolor="#ffcccc"
| 22 || April 11 || at No. 25 Michigan || Ray Fisher Stadium • Ann Arbor, Michigan || 7–16 || Denner (2–0) || Neely (1–1) || None || 250 || 13–9 || 13–9
|- bgcolor="#ffcccc"
| 23 || April 16 || at Maryland || Bob "Turtle" Smith Stadium • College Park, Maryland || 6–10 || Burke (2–2) || Burhenn (2–2) || None || 100 || 13–10 || 13–10
|- bgcolor="#ffcccc"
| 24 || April 17 || at Maryland || Bob "Turtle" Smith Stadium • College Park, Maryland || 4–5 || Falco (2–1) || Brock (0–1) || None || 100 || 13–11 || 13–11
|- bgcolor="#ffcccc"
| 25 || April 18 || at Maryland || Bob "Turtle" Smith Stadium • College Park, Maryland || 4–9 || Savacool (5–1) || Neely (1–2) || None || 100 || 13–12 || 13–12
|- bgcolor="#ccffcc"
| 26 || April 23 ||  || Bill Davis Stadium • Columbus, Ohio || 11–6 || Burhenn (3–2) || Shingle (1–2) || None || 282 || 14–12 || 14–12
|- bgcolor="#ccffcc"
| 27 || April 24 || Penn State || Bill Davis Stadium • Columbus, Ohio || 7–0 || Lonsway (2–4) || Larkin (2–5) || None || 237 || 15–12 || 15–12
|- bgcolor="#ffcccc"
| 28 || April 25 || Penn State || Bill Davis Stadium • Columbus, Ohio || 6–10 || Mellott (5–5) || Coupet (2–3) || None || 324 || 15–13 || 15–13
|- bgcolor="#ccffcc"
| 29 || April 30 || Purdue || Bill Davis Stadium • Columbus, Ohio || 11–3 || Burhenn (3–3) || Schapira (0–5) || None || 205 || 16–13 || 16–13
|-

|- bgcolor="#ccffcc"
| 30 || May 1 || Purdue || Bill Davis Stadium • Columbus, Ohio || 12–2 || Lonsway (3–4) || Johnson (2–4) || None || 305 || 17–13 || 17–13
|- bgcolor="#ffcccc"
| 31 || May 2 || Purdue || Bill Davis Stadium • Columbus, Ohio || 15–16 || Hildebrand (2–1) || Murphy (4–4) || Smeltz (1) || 296 || 17–14 || 17–14
|- bgcolor="#bbbbbb"
| – || May 7 || at  || Siebert Field • Minneapolis, Minnesota || colspan=9| Cancelled due to COVID-19 protocols
|- bgcolor="#bbbbbb"
| – || May 8 || at Minnesota || Siebert Field • Minneapolis, Minnesota || colspan=9| Cancelled due to COVID-19 protocols
|- bgcolor="#bbbbbb"
| – || May 9 || at Minnesota || Siebert Field • Minneapolis, Minnesota || colspan=9| Cancelled due to COVID-19 protocols
|- bgcolor="#ccffcc"
| 32 || May 15 || at Purdue || Alexander Field • West Lafayette, Indiana || 5–1 || Burhenn (5–2) || Brooks (2–2) || None || 400 || 18–14 || 18–14
|- bgcolor="#ffcccc"
| 33 || May 14 ||  || Bill Davis Stadium • Columbus, Ohio || 7–10 || Erla (4–5) || Lonsway (4–5) || Christophers (1) || 267 || 18–15 || 18–15
|- bgcolor="#ffcccc"
| 34 || May 15 || Michigan State || Bill Davis Stadium • Columbus, Ohio || 0–2 || Jones (2–0) || Coupet (0–2) || Benschoter (1) || – || 18–16 || 18–16
|- bgcolor="#ccffcc"
| 35 || May 16 || Michigan State || Bill Davis Stadium • Columbus, Ohio || 7–3 || Neely (2–2) || Benschoter (3–4) || None || 295 || 19–16 || 19–16
|- align="center" bgcolor="#ffcccc"
| 36 || May 22 || vs Nebraska || Bart Kaufman Field • Bloomington, Indiana || 9–11 || Olson (1–0) || Neely (2–3) || Schwellenbach (7) || 150 || 19–17 || 19–17
|- align="center" bgcolor="#ffcccc"
| 37 || May 23 || vs Nebraska || Bart Kaufman Field • Bloomington, Indiana || 0–9 || Perry (1–0) || Pfennig (0–3) || None || 150 || 19–18 || 19–18
|- align="center" bgcolor="#ccffcc"
| 38 || May 23 || at Indiana || Bart Kaufman Field • Bloomington, Indiana || 3–1 || Burhenn (3–1) || Bierman (5–4) || None || 150 || 20–18 || 20–18
|- align="center" bgcolor="#ffcccc"
| 39 || May 24 || at Indiana || Bart Kaufman Field • Bloomington, Indiana || 0–2 || Modugno (3–1) || Coupet (0–3) || Macciocchi (1) || 150 || 20–19 || 20–19
|- align="center" bgcolor="#ccffcc"
| 40 || May 28 || Northwestern || Bill Davis Stadium • Columbus, Ohio || 13–10 || Pfennig (3–1) || Pate (1–1) || Brock (8) || 183 || 21–19 || 21–19
|- align="center" bgcolor="#ccffcc"
| 41 || May 29 || Northwestern || Bill Davis Stadium • Columbus, Ohio || 4–1 || Burhenn (7–2) || Christie (0–1) || Brock (9) || 270 || 22–19 || 22–19
|- align="center" bgcolor="#ffcccc"
| 42 || May 30 || Northwestern || Bill Davis Stadium • Columbus, Ohio || 2–8 ||  Uberstine (3–3) || Haberthier (0–1) || None || 350 || 22–20 || 22–20
|-

Awards

Big Ten Conference Players of the Week

Conference awards

2021 MLB draft

References

Ohio State
Ohio State Buckeyes baseball seasons
Ohio State